Cressage railway station was a railway station on the Severn Valley Railway. It opened on 1 February 1862 with a single platform and a siding. By 1898 it had acquired an additional platform along with a signal box and the sidings had been expanded.

The station was listed in the Beeching Report as a "passenger station already under consideration for closure before the formulation of the report". It closed on 9 September 1963,

References

Further reading

Disused railway stations in Shropshire
Former Great Western Railway stations
Railway stations in Great Britain opened in 1862
Railway stations in Great Britain closed in 1963
1862 establishments in England